Christmas in Canaan is a 2009 American/Canadian drama film starring country music singer Billy Ray Cyrus. The film is based on the book of the same name written by country music artist Kenny Rogers and Donald Davenport. Filming began at the end of August 2009 and finished in mid-September. It was filmed in Vancouver, British Columbia, Canada.

The film premiered on December 12, 2009, on the Hallmark Channel. Its theme song, "We'll Get By Somehow (We Always Do)" (performed by Cyrus), was made into a music video.

Plot
In the rural town of Canaan, Texas, a clash between two classmates – one, a tough farm boy, and the other, a bright bookish black boy – evolves into an unlikely friendship. The boys' families devise a plan to teach them a lesson after they fight, but it is a wounded puppy that eventually brings them together. It is amidst the magic of Christmas that the boys learn about family, hope, and love despite living under the shadow of racism.

Cast
 Billy Ray Cyrus as Daniel Burton 
 Ben Cotton as Buddy
 Emily Tennant as Sarah
 Jacob Blair as DJ
 Matt Ward as Rodney
 Liam James as Bobby
 Tom McBeath as Earl
 Jessica McLeod as Young Sarah
 Darien Provost as Young Bobby
 Zak Ludwig as Young DJ
 Nico McEown as Jimmy Ray
 Stefanie Samuels as Angela
 Tom Heaton as Wylie
 Rukiya Bernard as Charlane
 Jaishon Fisher as Young Rodney
 Julian Christopher as Shoup
 Paul Herbert as Clancey
 Candus Churchill as Eunice
 Stacee Copeland as Nurse
 Lossen Chambers as Celie

See also
Billy Ray Cyrus filmography 
 List of Christmas films

References

External links
 
 "We'll Get By Somehow (We Always Do)" Music Video
 Billy Ray Official Site

2000s Christmas drama films
2009 television films
2009 films
American Christmas drama films
Canadian Christmas drama films
English-language Canadian films
Canadian drama television films
Christmas television films
Films about racism
Films set in Texas
Films shot in Vancouver
Hallmark Channel original films
2009 drama films
Films based on American novels
Films directed by Neill Fearnley
American drama television films
2000s English-language films
2000s American films
2000s Canadian films